Mika Sakari Nieminen (born 1 January 1966, in Tampere, Finland) is a retired professional ice hockey player who played in the SM-liiga. He played for Ilves, Jokerit and HIFK. He was inducted into the Finnish Hockey Hall of Fame in 2005.

During the 1994-1995 season, when playing for Luleå HF, he became the top scorer during both the regular Elitserien season and the Swedish national championship play-offs. He never won championships at club level, but he did win the 1995 World Championship with Finland.

Career statistics

Regular season and playoffs

International

References

External links
Mika Nieminen at Finnish Hockey Hall of Fame page 

1966 births
Living people
Finnish expatriate ice hockey players in Sweden
Finnish expatriate ice hockey players in Switzerland
Finnish ice hockey centres
HIFK (ice hockey) players
Ice hockey people from Tampere
Ilves players
Jokerit players
Luleå HF players
Ice hockey players at the 1992 Winter Olympics
Ice hockey players at the 1994 Winter Olympics
Ice hockey players at the 1998 Winter Olympics
Medalists at the 1998 Winter Olympics
Olympic bronze medalists for Finland
Olympic ice hockey players of Finland
Olympic medalists in ice hockey
Medalists at the 1994 Winter Olympics